Bremen is an unincorporated community in Jo Daviess County, Illinois, United States.

References

Unincorporated communities in Jo Daviess County, Illinois
Unincorporated communities in Illinois